Arthur Henry Havens Sinclair MD FRSE FRCSEd LLD (20 February 1868 – 30 Jun 1962) was a 20th-century Scottish ophthalmologist. He was a pioneer of quantitative perimetry, introducing this technique of visual field testing to Britain. Sinclair also introduced the operation of intracapsular extraction of the lens for cataract into the UK. He was Surgeon-Oculist to King George VI  in Scotland.

Early life
Sinclair was born at Kenmore in Perthshire on 20 February 1868, the youngest son  of Rev Alan Sinclair, minister of the Free Church of Kenmore, and his wife Sarah (née Fraser). He studied medicine at the University of Edinburgh graduating  MB CM in 1893 and went on to graduate with the postgraduate degree of MD in 1899.

Career 
Having decided to specialise in ophthalmology at an early stage, he gained experience in that speciality by visiting clinics in London, Utrecht and Copenhagen.  He became a Fellow of the Royal College of Surgeons of Edinburgh in 1899. 

Also in 1899 he was appointed  clinical assistant  in ophthalmology at the Royal Infirmary of Edinburgh (RIE) under Sir George Berry from whom he learned the fundamentals of clinical perimetry. Berry maintained links with the ophthalmic surgeons in Copenhagen who had developed the technique and Sinclair was able to develop this further.  In 1905 he was made Assistant Ophthalmic Surgeon in the RIE and  Ophthalmic Surgeon to Leith Hospital and to the Royal Hospital for Sick Children in Edinburgh.

In the First World War he served in the Royal Army Medical Corps with the Salonika Expeditionary Force. From 1922 to 1932 he was Surgeon in charge of wards at the RIE. 

His main contributions to ophthalmology were the introduction of quantitative perimetry, a method for measuring the visual fields. he described the use of this technique in the diagnosis of glaucoma. Sinclair introduced the operation of intracapsular extraction of the lens for cataract. His series of 257 cases published in 1932 was regarded as showing the best results published to that time.

After retiring he became chairman of the W H Ross Foundation for the Study of the Prevention of Blindness. It was on Sinclair's suggestion the fund was established. Among the advances which the Foundation made was the successful treatment of infections of the cornea in coal miners which greatly reduced the resulting blindness in that occupational group.

Honours and awards 
In 1927 he became President of the Ophthalmologigical Section of the British Medical Association and was elected a member of the Aesculapian Club. In 1938 he was elected a Fellow of the Royal Society of Edinburgh. His proposers were Francis Albert Eley Crew, Orlando Charnock Bradley,  Sir Harold Stiles, James Watt and Ralph Stockman. Sinclair was a member of the Royal Company of Archers, the Queen's Bodyguard for Scotland. He was Surgeon-Oculist to King George VI  in Scotland. from 1929

Death 
He died at home in Edinburgh on 30 June 1962. He was buried in Dean Cemetery in western Edinburgh. The grave lies at the western end of the south-west section within the first north extension. He is also memorialised on his parents' grave in Kenmore.

Publications
The Pathology of the Idiopathic Detachment of the Retina (1901)
The Early Diagnosis of Glaucoma
Developmental Aphasia also known as Congenital Word-Blindness or Dyslexia (1948)

Family
In 1898 he married Mabel Kennedy Tod (1871–1947). They had one son and one daughter. Prior to the First World War he lived at 5 Walker Street in Edinburgh's West End. Between the wars he lived  at 22 Rothesay Terrace, a spacious two-level apartment in Edinburgh's West End. Latterly he lived in Charlotte Square, the elegant Adam-designed square in Edinburgh's New Town.

References

1868 births
1962 deaths
People from Perthshire
Alumni of the University of Edinburgh
Alumni of the University of Edinburgh Medical School
Scottish ophthalmologists
Presidents of the Royal College of Surgeons of Edinburgh
Fellows of the Royal Society of Edinburgh
Burials at the Dean Cemetery